The Serbia national under-21 football team  is the national under-21 football team of Serbia and is controlled by the Football Association of Serbia. Both FIFA and UEFA consider the Serbian national team to be the direct and sole successor of the Yugoslavia under-21 and Serbia and Montenegro under-21 national teams.

History

Serbia's under-21 national team qualified for the 2007 UEFA European Under-21 Football Championship held in the Netherlands, in June 2007, after winning a two-game play-off against Sweden. After a 3–0 loss at home, Serbia overturned the result two weeks later, defeating Sweden 5–0, and advancing to the final tournament. Serbia's 2007 U21 Championship campaign was successful, as they finished in second place, losing the final to the hosts, by a score of 4–1. On their way to the final, they defeated Italy (1–0), Czech Republic (1–0) and Belgium (2–0). The only other loss, besides the final, was the third group game against England (0–2), which was a meaningless game for the Serbian team, as they had already qualified for the semi-finals.

Competitive record

 Champions   Runners-Up   Third Place   Fourth Place

European Under-21 Championship record

Olympic Games record

Recent results and forthcoming fixtures

2022

2023

2024

Players

Current squad
The following players have been called up for Friendly matches against Italy on 24 and USA on 28 March 2023.

Caps and goals updated as of 22 November 2022 after the match against North Macedonia.

Recent call-ups
The following players have been called up for the team in the last twelve months, that are still eligible to represent Serbia at youth

Previous squads
 2004 UEFA European Under-21 Championship squad
 2006 UEFA European Under-21 Championship squad
 2007 UEFA European Under-21 Championship squad
 2009 UEFA European Under-21 Championship squad
 2015 UEFA European Under-21 Championship squad
 2017 UEFA European Under-21 Championship squad
 2019 UEFA European Under-21 Championship squad

Coaches

See also
 Serbia national under-21 football team results
 UEFA European Under-21 Football Championship
 Serbia national football team
 Serbia national under-20 football team 
 Serbia national under-19 football team
 Yugoslavia national under-21 football team

Notes

References

External links

Football Association of Serbia 

 
European national under-21 association football teams